Pontprennau and Old St Mellons is an electoral ward in Cardiff, Wales. Covering the communities of Old St Mellons and Pontprennau, it is represented by two councillors on Cardiff Council.

Description
The areas of Pontprennau and Old St Mellons are separated from one another by the A48 road in the northeast of Cardiff. While Old St Mellons is one of the original villages in the area, Pontprennau is a new development of housing and shops.

Pontprennau and Old St Mellons has a population that probably now exceeds 10,000 people (8,037 from Census data, 2001 and 9,720 in 2011) due to sustained housebuilding in the Pontprennau section of the division, which is likely to continue for the next 10 years as a major urban expansion of up to 4,000 homes is constructed.

It is bounded by Caerphilly county borough to the north; and by the wards of Trowbridge to the southeast; Llanrumney and Pentwyn to the south; and Lisvane to the west.

Governance
The electoral ward falls within the parliamentary constituency of Cardiff North, which has been represented by the Labour Party MP Anna McMorrin since 2017.

In the Senedd, Cardiff North is represented by Welsh Labour MS Julie Morgan.

Local Government
In May 2017 the Conservative Party won back the seat they'd lost to Labour in 2012.

* = sitting councillor prior to the election

After the May 2012 election the ward was represented at Cardiff Council by Georgina Phillips of Welsh Labour (1326 votes) and Dianne Rees of the Welsh Conservative Party (1004 votes). Cllr Phillips won back the seat that she'd lost at the May 2008 election, unseating sitting Conservative councillor Jane Rogers.

Prior to 1999 the ward included neighbouring Lisvane and was called Lisvane & St Mellons.

References

Cardiff electoral wards